In mathematics, the term quadratic describes something that pertains to squares, to the operation of squaring, to terms of the second degree, or equations or formulas that involve such terms.  Quadratus is Latin for square.

Mathematics

Algebra (elementary and abstract) 
 Quadratic function (or quadratic polynomial), a polynomial function that contains terms of at most second degree
 Complex quadratic polynomials, are particularly interesting for their sometimes chaotic properties under iteration
 Quadratic equation, a polynomial equation of degree 2 (reducible to 0 = ax2 + bx + c)
 Quadratic formula, calculation to solve a quadratic equation for the independent variable (x)
 Quadratic field, an algebraic number field of degree two over the field of rational numbers
 Quadratic irrational or "quadratic surd", an irrational number that is a root of a quadratic polynomial

Calculus 
 Quadratic integral, the integral of the reciprocal of a second-degree polynomial

Statistics and stochastics 
 Quadratic form (statistics), scalar quantity ε'Λε for an n-dimensional square matrix
 Quadratic mean, the square root of the mean of the squares of the data
 Quadratic variation, in stochastics, useful for the analysis of Brownian motion and martingales

Number theory 
 Quadratic reciprocity, a theorem from number theory
 Quadratic residue, an integer that is a square modulo n
 Quadratic sieve, a modern integer factorization algorithm

Other mathematics 
 Quadratic convergence, in which the distance to a convergent sequence's limit is squared at each step
 Quadratic differential, a form on a Riemann surface that locally looks like the square of an abelian differential
 Quadratic form, a homogeneous polynomial of degree two in any number of variables
 Quadratic programming, a special type of mathematical optimization problem
 Quadratic growth, an asymptotic growth rate proportional to a quadratic function
 Periodic points of complex quadratic mappings, a type of graph that can be used to explore stability in control systems
 Quadratic bézier curve, a type of bezier curve

Computer science 
 Quadratic probing, a scheme in computer programming for resolving collisions in hash tables
 Quadratic classifier, used in machine learning to separate measurements of two or more classes of objects
 Quadratic time, in referring to algorithms with quadratic time complexity

Other 
Quadratic (collection), a 1953 collection of science fiction novels by Olaf Stapledon and Murray Leinster

See also
 
 
 Cubic (disambiguation), relating to a cube or degree 3, as next higher above quadratic
 Linear, relating to a line or degree 1, as next lower below quadratic
 Quad (disambiguation)
 Quadratic transformation (disambiguation)